The 2019–20 season will be Siófok KC's 11th competitive and consecutive season in the Nemzeti Bajnokság I.

Players

Squad information

Goalkeepers
 7  Melinda Szikora
 12  Silje Solberg
 77  Kincső Csapó
Left Wingers
 9  Júlia Hársfalvi
 13  Camille Aoustin
 55  Kíra Wald
Right Wingers
 8  Simone Böhme
 23  Nelly Such
Line players
 17  Katarina Ježić
 20  Joanna Drabik 
 66  Póczik Kata

Left Backs
 11  Kjerstin Boge Solås
 32  Andrea Kobetić
 44  Laura Lapos 
Centre Backs
 25  Nerea Pena (c)
 29  Gnonsiane Niombla 
Right Backs
 21  Csilla Németh
 33  Zsuzsanna Tomori
 88  Anđela Janjušević

Transfers
Source:  hetmeteres.hu

 In:
 Kincső Csapó (from Dunaújváros)
 Júlia Hársfalvi (from Győri ETO)
 Gnonsiane Niombla (from  Metz)
 Nerea Pena (from Ferencváros)
 Kjerstin Boge Solås (from  Tertnes)
 Melinda Szikora (from Ferencváros)
 Zsuzsanna Tomori (from Győri ETO)

 Out:
  Denisa Dedu (to  CSM București)
 Asma Elghaoui (to  SCM Râmnicu Vâlcea)
  Melinda Geiger (retired)
  Mireya González (to  SCM Râmnicu Vâlcea)
  Tatyana Khmyrova (temporarily pauses his career)
  Estelle Nze Minko (to Győri ETO)
  Gabriela Perianu (to  CSM București)

Club

Technical Staff

Source: Coaches, Management

Uniform
Supplier: hummel
Main sponsor: tippmix / Peszter Kft. / Budapest Bank
Back sponsor: PulaiQuontroll Kft. / VABEKO Kft.

Competitions

Overview

Nemzeti Bajnokság I

Results by round

Matches

Results overview

Hungarian Cup

Matches

EHF Cup

Third qualifying round

Siófok KC won, 61–58 on aggregate.

Group stage

Matches

Results overview

Knockout stage

Quarter-finals

Semi-finals

Statistics

Top scorers
Includes all competitive matches. The list is sorted by shirt number when total goals are equal.
Last updated on 8 March 2020

Attendances
List of the home matches:

References

External links
 
 Siófok KC at eurohandball.com

 
Siófok KC